Funnyman is a fictional comic book character whose adventures were published in 1948 by Magazine Enterprises.

Publication history
After leaving DC Comics and suing that company in a dispute over the rights to their character Superman, Jerry Siegel and Joe Shuster rejoined their former DC editor Vin Sullivan — who had edited the earliest Superman adventures — at his new company, Magazine Enterprises.

Siegel and Shuster's new creation, Funnyman, starred in a series that ran six issues (cover-dated Jan.–Aug. 1948). 

In the first issue, Siegel and Shuster mocked what they saw as the rush of Superman clones in a story called "Funman, Comicman and Laffman". In the story, TV comedian Larry Davis dresses up in a costume to catch a fake criminal for a publicity stunt, but he catches a real criminal instead, and decides to become a superhero.

Funnyman's enemies include Doc Gimmick, a criminal robot, and the crime team of Schemer Beamer, Bug-Eyes, Crusher, Rockjaw and the Curve.

A newspaper comic strip debuted in October 1948, but Funnyman also failed to find an audience in this format, and the strip was soon dropped.

References

External links

Further reading

1948 comics debuts
1948 comics endings
Comics characters introduced in 1948
American comic strips
Characters created by Jerry Siegel
Characters created by Joe Shuster
Fictional comedians
Magazine Enterprises titles